is a Shinto Shrine in Kamigyō-ku, Kyoto

The Shrine is dedicated to the veneration of the kami of Emperor Junnin and Emperor Sutoku. Annually in mid–September two Noh performances are held at the Shiramine Shrine in memory of Emperor Sutoku.

Shiramine is also home to the deity Seidai Myojin who is popularly known as the god of sports, and especially soccer.

The lucky charm(叶う輪 Kanauwa) of Shiramine Shrine is very popular to worshipers. Kanauwa is Lucky charm of sports.

Kanpei-sha
In 1871, the  identified the hierarchy of government-supported shrines most closely associated with the Imperial family. The kampeisha were shrines venerated by the imperial family. This category encompasses those sanctuaries enshrining emperors, imperial family members, or meritorious retainers of the Imperial family.
Kanpei-taisha

Festivals

Shunki Reitaisai Festival

(Grand Festival of Spring)

April 14

Kemari 10:30 a.m.

Budō(武道）shoureisai

(Festival of Budō(武道）)

May 5

Japanese Budō Demonstration from9:00 a.m.(all day long)

Seidaimyoujin Reisai Festival

July 7

Kemari 2:00 p.m.

Komachi-odori 4:30 p.m.

See also
 List of Jingū
 Modern system of ranked Shinto Shrines
 Kemari

Notes

References
 Ponsonby-Fane, Richard Arthur Brabazon. (1959).  The Imperial House of Japan. Kyoto: Ponsonby Memorial Society. OCLC 194887
 ___. (1962).  Studies in Shinto and Shrines. Kyoto: Ponsonby Memorial Society. OCLC 399449
 ___. (1963).  The Vicissitudes of Shinto. Kyoto: Ponsonby Memorial Society.

External links

 Shiramine Shrine Official Site (English, Japanese)
 Photos of (叶う輪 Kanauwa)

Jingū
Shinto shrines in Kyoto
Emperor Sutoku
Beppyo shrines